Peter Pontiac (born Peter J.G. Pollmann; 28 April 1951 – 20 January 2015) was a Dutch cartoonist, comics artist and illustrator. He was the winner of the 1997 Stripschapprijs. Pontiac died on 20 January 2015, after a lengthy battle with severe liver disease.

Biography

He was known for leading a life in the fringe and was addicted to heroin for several years, something he drew autobiographical comics about as well. He illustrated various album covers for bands like Parados, Thud!, The Bouncers, The Schizofrenics, Dead Moon and bootleg singles by Lou Reed and Bob Dylan.

At the time of his death, Pontiac was working on a new graphic novel (STYX of de zesplankenkoorts) about his disease and awaiting death. He got money for this project through crowd funding.

Lettering
For Oog & Blik he did the lettering of the Dutch editions of Art Spiegelman's Maus and Robert Crumb's Introducing Kafka.

Bibliography
 2011 - Rhythm, Oog & Blik (Complete collected comics 1969–2011, except Kraut)
 2000 - Kraut Biografiek (Podium)
 1998 - De ketens van kitsch 
 1998 - The Quick Brown Fax
 1990-1997 - Pontiac Review (a series of 7 books) (Oog & Blik)
 1997 - Lost in the Lowlands, self-published, 2nd printing Oog & Blik
 1994 - De luchtgitaar (Meulenhoff) 
 1993 - The making of sacred pin-ups (Griffioen) 
 1990 - Requiem Fortissimo (Oog & Blik)
 1981 - Natural Jewboy (illustr.)

Awards
 1997 - Stripschapprijs for his entire oeuvre
 1998 - Professor Pi Illustrator's Prize from the city of Amsterdam
 2011 - Marten Toonderprijs for his entire oeuvre

References

External links

 Peter Pontiac at Lambiek

1951 births
2015 deaths
Dutch cartoonists
Dutch comics artists
Underground cartoonists
Dutch illustrators
Album-cover and concert-poster artists
People from Beverwijk
Deaths from liver disease
Winners of the Stripschapsprijs